Clerk is a 1989 Indian Hindi-language action thriller film written, produced and directed by Manoj Kumar and starring Manoj Kumar alongside an ensemble cast including Rekha, Anita Raj, Shashi Kapoor, Rajendra Kumar, Ashok Kumar, Prem Chopra and Sonu Walia. Pakistani actors Mohammed Ali and Zeba also appear in their first and only Hindi film. This was the last film Manoj Kumar directed that had him in the leading role.

Plot synopsis

The film is a story of an honest clerk, Bharat (Manoj Kumar), who along with his family faces immense difficulties owing to their poverty. The plot revolves around the circumstances which force him to become corrupt. In the end, he repents and becomes honest again — while also saving his nation from anti-nationals.

Cast
Manoj Kumar as Bharat
Rekha as Sneh
Mohammad Ali as Ram
Zeba as Ram's wife
Anita Raj
Prem Chopra as Saadhuraam
Ashok Kumar as Bharat and Ram's father
Shashi Kapoor as Vijay Kapoor
Rajendra Kumar as Khan
Rajiv Goswami as Balram
Sonu Walia
Om Shivpuri

Music
The music was composed by Jagdish Khanna, Uttam Singh and Uttam Ghosh. The music was released under T-Series.

"Jhoom Jhoom Kar Gaao Re, Aaj Pandrah August Hai" - Mahendra Kapoor, Lata Mangeshkar
"Mai Ek Clerk Hu" - Mahendra Kapoor
"Neelaam Ghar Me Humne" - Lata Mangeshkar
"Rakh Geeta Pe Haath" - Nitin Mukesh, Lata Mangeshkar
"Kadam Kadam" - Mahendra Kapoor
"Tumse Jo Baat Hui" - Bhupinder Singh
"Tun Tun Tun Tun Tun" - Lata Mangeshkar

References

1980s Hindi-language films
1989 films
Indian drama films
Films about corruption in India
1989 crime drama films
Hindi-language drama films
Films directed by Manoj Kumar